Patrick Tiernan (born 11 September 1994) is an Australian long-distance track and road runner. In addition to having won multiple road races in Australia, Tiernan represented Villanova in cross country and track. He also qualified for the 2016 Olympic Games and the 2020 Olympic Games. He was the 2016 Men's DI National Cross Country champion.

Running career

Youth
Tiernan was born in Longreach and raised in Toowoomba, where he took up distance running. He went to St. Joseph's College, Toowoomba. In July 2012 he won the 10 kilometres race that was part of the Gold Coast Marathon.

Collegiate
Tiernan was recruited by Villanova in January 2013 and missed out on the first indoor and outdoor track seasons. At the 2014 NCAA DI Indoor T&F Championships, Tiernan finished in seventh place in the 5000 meters final round. At the 2014 NCAA DI Outdoor T&F Championships, Tiernan placed sixth in the 5000 meters, earning his first All-American honors in track and field in his NCAA collegiate career. He placed second overall at the 2015 NCAA DI Cross Country Championships behind Edward Cheserek, whom he beat in 2016 when he won the men's overall title.

Achievements

2011: 1st, Australian Junior (U18) cross country champion
2012: 1st, Gold Coast 10km run, Gold Coast, Queensland, Australia
2012: 1st, 1500 meters (3:50.67) U20 Australian Championships
2012: 1st, 5000 meters (14:40.59) U20 Australian Championships
2012: 1st, U20 Australian Championships cross country
2016: 4th, 5000 m 13:41.37, Australian Athletics Championships Sydney Olympic Park Athletic Centre Sydney New South Wales
2016: 20th, 5000 m 13:28, Athletics at the 2016 Summer Olympics – Men's 5000 metres Brazil
2017: 13th, 10000 m 29:19, 2017 IAAF World Cross Country Championships – Senior men's race Kampala Uganda
2018: 4th, 5000 m 13:26.38 Australian Championships Gold Coast, Queensland

In March 2017, Tiernan was signed to a sponsorship agreement with Nike Australia and joined Melbourne Track Club and trains with Villanova University coach Marcus O'Sullivan.

References

External links 

 
 
 
 
 
 
 All Athletics Profile
 Patrick Tiernan Interview 25 November 2016
 Patrick Tiernan Villanova University profile 20 November 2016
 Patrick Tiernan Villanova University Interview 5 July 2016

1994 births
Living people
Australian male middle-distance runners
Australian male long-distance runners
Villanova Wildcats men's track and field athletes
Athletes (track and field) at the 2016 Summer Olympics
Olympic athletes of Australia
World Athletics Championships athletes for Australia
Athletes (track and field) at the 2018 Commonwealth Games
Villanova Wildcats men's cross country runners
Commonwealth Games competitors for Australia
Athletes (track and field) at the 2020 Summer Olympics